Hy Anzell (September 7, 1923 – August 23, 2003) was a Yiddish-speaking American actor.  He originated the role of the flower shop owner, "Mr. Mushnik", in the original off-Broadway production of Little Shop of Horrors with Ellen Greene and Lee Wilkof.  He was also in the original 1976 Broadway cast of Checking Out.

He appeared in dozens of films and television programs.  He had roles in a number of films directed by Woody Allen, beginning with Bananas, and notably including Annie Hall (in which he had his best-known movie role as Uncle Joey Nichols).

He died of natural causes at age 79. Anzell was Jewish.

Filmography

References

External links

Hy Anzell at the Lortel Archives

American male film actors
American male television actors
American male stage actors
Male actors from New York City
1923 births
2003 deaths
Yiddish-speaking people
20th-century American male actors
American male musical theatre actors
21st-century American male actors
20th-century American singers
20th-century American male singers
Jewish American male actors
20th-century American Jews
21st-century American Jews